The Health Service of Castile-La Mancha (sescam) is the public agency responsible for the system of public health services in the autonomous community of Castilla–La Mancha, Spain.

History
The headquarters are located at the Calle de los Huérfanos Cristinos, in Toledo, the regional capital. Legally created in 2000, it was not until two years later, on 1 January 2002, when the SESCAM assumed the services of the INSALUD. Since 2015, Regina Leal serves as managing director of the SESCAM.

The region is divided in 8 health areas: Albacete, La Mancha Centro, Ciudad Real, Cuenca, Guadalajara, Talavera de la Reina, Toledo and Puertollano, with, as of 31 December 2018, a total number of 20 hospitals operated by the SESCAM, 4 additional public hospitals not operated by the SESCAM and 8 private hospitals.

References 

Health care in Castilla–La Mancha
Government of Castilla–La Mancha